Vol. 3: (The Subliminal Verses) is the third studio album by American heavy metal band Slipknot, released on May 25, 2004, by Roadrunner Records. A special edition, containing a bonus disc, was released on April 12, 2005. It is the band's only album produced by Rick Rubin. Following the band's tour to promote its second album in 2002, speculation regarding the future began. Some band members had already been involved in side projects including Murderdolls, To My Surprise, and the reformation of Stone Sour. In 2003, Slipknot moved into The Mansion to work on the album. Initially, the band was unproductive; lead vocalist Corey Taylor was drinking heavily. Nevertheless, the band managed to write more than enough material for a new album. Vol. 3 is credited as Slipknot's first to incorporate more traditional, melodic song structures, guitar solos and acoustic instruments.

The album received generally positive reviews. Slipknot was praised by AllMusic for its "dedication to making it a Slipknot album", while Q added that the album was "a triumph". The album peaked within the top ten in album sales across eleven countries, and went Platinum in the United States. The band also received the Grammy Award for Best Metal Performance for the song "Before I Forget". At the end of 2009, "Before I Forget" was listed as "AOL's Top Metal Song of the Decade". Roadrunner Records have listed the music video for "Duality" as the best music video in Roadrunner history.

Recording 

Slipknot recorded Vol. 3: The Subliminal Verses with producer Rick Rubin at The Mansion in Los Angeles in 2003. There had been speculation regarding the possibility of a third album and the band's future, owing to members working on other musical projects. After the album was completed, the band said these side projects "saved the band" and "helped [them] break out of the box [they] were in". Coming back together and working out their differences hindered the writing process initially. In 2008, drummer Joey Jordison said, "We didn't talk to each other for three months, we just sat there wasting money in the fucking Houdini mansion." Percussionist Shawn Crahan stated, "Eventually we got sick of waiting for shit to happen. We got together, had a few beers and wrote a really artsy, fucked up song called 'Happy Ending'."

In a 2003 interview, Jordison explained that despite the initial problems more than enough material was written for the album and added that "it's better to have stuff to pick from than to settle for shit", in contrast to how Slipknot settled too soon with fewer songs on previous albums. Band members were divided over their experience of working with producer Rubin; some doubted his commitment to Slipknot as he split his time between many artists at once. Lead vocalist Corey Taylor admitted in an interview that he drank heavily throughout their time in the mansion, saying "I would drink from the moment I got up until the moment I passed out." He explained that; "everything I did while I was drinking sounded like shit", while expressing how unhappy he was with the choice of vocal takes which ended up on the album. During this time, percussionist Crahan worked on Voliminal: Inside the Nine, a video documenting the creation process of the album and the touring which would follow.

In a Q&A for his book You're Making Me Hate You, Taylor stated that the first verse and chorus of the track "Circle" was written and recorded during the Iowa tour in 2001, and that it was the same take that ended up on the album.

The group had mixed opinions regarding their experience of working with Rick Rubin. In 2008, Taylor said he met Rubin only four times during the entire recording of Vol. 3… and that Rubin barely showed up to the studio: "We were being charged horrendous amounts of money. And for me, if you're going to produce something, you're fucking there. I don't care who you are." He added: "He is overrated, he is overpaid, and I will never work with him again." Conversely, guitarist Jim Root said in that same interview, "A lot of the guys in the band say Rick was unavailable. And yeah, he takes on a lot of projects at one time, but he also does things that are beneficial. He would listen to what we'd done, then have us retrack things that needed work. He's kind of like Big Brother up on the hill. Even though he wasn't there physically every day, he was. [Vol. 3 is] my favorite record we've done."

Musical and lyrical themes
Before the release of Vol. 3, band members had promised a more experimental album; drummer Jordison said that "it's almost as if Slayer was tapping on Radiohead". For the first time in Slipknot's career, songs such as "Circle" and "Vermilion Pt. 2" were led by an acoustic rather than an electric guitar. According to Todd Burns of Stylus, songs such as "Pulse of the Maggots" and "Before I Forget" incorporate a "pounding metal" style. AllMusic wrote that tracks, such as "The Blister Exists", "Three Nil", and "Opium of the People", combine the two extremes of their recognizable metal edge with melody, and the most apparent shifts being in Taylor's vocal style, with relatively few songs relying solely on screamed vocals in comparison to their earlier work. Entertainment Weekly wrote that the album "[bounced] between over-powering speed-metal and haunting acoustic rock".

Vol. 3: The Subliminal Verses is Slipknot's first album that does not warrant a Parental Advisory label, mainly because the lyrics of Vol. 3, compared to other Slipknot albums, are much less explicit in terms of profanity and obscure dark themes. While the standard edition does not feature the warning label, the special edition does due to the heavy profanity found in its bonus content. In a 2008 interview, guitarist Mick Thomson explained that vocalist Corey Taylor made a point of avoiding the use of profanity in response to claims that he relied on use of it. Only two instances of profanity occur on the album, which are the use of the word "bitched" in "Duality" and "bastards" which appears in the intro monologue for "Pulse of the Maggots".

According to AllMusic, the lyrics of Vol. 3: (The Subliminal Verses) include metaphors and touch on themes that include anger, disaffection, and psychosis. Taylor's diversity in his vocal delivery was praised; Burns considered tracks like "Vermilion Pt. 2" to have "stately vocal harmonies". Taylor's performance on the closing track "Danger – Keep Away" was specifically praised; Stylus called it the most "depressing and emotional" track on the album. Burns concluded that overall "the riffs have lost none of their impact, but it seems like finally the group also wants you to appreciate their vocal and lyrical impact."

Artwork 
The cover of the album features the "maggot mask" designed by Shawn Crahan. The name of the mask is a reference to the name given to fans by the band. The mask was made of stitched leather, with a zipper around the mouth area, and copies can be obtained as part of the band's merchandise. It is featured in the music video for the album's second single "Vermilion", in which the band appears whenever the protagonist wears the mask.

Promotion 

Prior to the release of the album, the band released "Pulse of the Maggots" in its entirety as a free downloadable track on the now defunct SK Radio website, it was available for one day only on March 30, 2004. This also marked the beginning of Slipknot's touring cycle, The Subliminal Verses World Tour, starting with their appearance on the Jägermeister Music Tour. On May 4, 2004, "Duality" was released as their first official single. Vol. 3: (The Subliminal Verses) was finally released on May 25, 2004, to coincide with the release of the album "Duality" was released on a special edition 7-inch red vinyl. Alongside the normal edition of the album Roadrunner Records also released a limited edition CD that could connect to the Slipknot web site and obtain new songs and other promotional material, but as of 2009 the link on the CD has stopped working. Other singles from the album included "Vermilion", "Before I Forget" and "The Blister Exists". On April 12, 2005, a special edition version of the album, containing a bonus disc, was released.

Critical reception 

Critical reception to Vol. 3: The Subliminal Verses was generally positive. It received a score of 70% on review aggregator Metacritic based on 12 reviews. Johnny Loftus of AllMusic called the album "not just another flashy alt-metal billboard", praising the band's "dedication to making it a Slipknot album". Todd Burns of Stylus wrote that people who accuse the band of having "softened" are "mistaking softness for maturation". Burns went on to call the album "the best pop inflected metal album since System of a Down's Toxicity". Sean Richardson of Entertainment Weekly gave the album an A− and wrote that it is a "deranged hippie update" of Slayer's "masterpiece" Reign in Blood, which was also produced by Rubin. Q hailed Vol. 3: The Subliminal Verses as "a triumph". John Robb of PlayLouder complimented Slipknot's unexpected rise to become "one of the biggest groups in the world", dubbing "Before I Forget" a "classic [Slipknot] anthem". Robb added that the album is better than Iowa, citing its "differing textures". Rolling Stone gave the album a rating of 3 out of 5, stating the album presented "newer extremes" for the band, "which in Slipknot's case means tunefulness and traditional song structures".

A review from the BBC praised the album, declaring that there "is no finer metal band on the planet". It cited the group's integration of "hyperactive bass drums, complex, compelling riffs and ridiculously fast fretwork" with more melodic styles and described Vermilion as "the key track ... an emotional, melodramatic, utterly convincing rollercoaster ride".

Alternative Press criticized the album, writing that it "plays out like a tepid, second-rate version of Iowa, which pretty much makes it a third-rate anything else." Yahoo!'s Chris Heath also reviewed the album negatively, writing that "The Nameless" combines "the ludicrously vicious and ridiculously placid" and that by doing so makes the track feel "awkward". Heath added, "the themes are predictably absurd ... yet mildly comical given the inclusion of such disparate styles stationed side by side."

Vol. 3: The Subliminal Verses peaked at position number two on the US Billboard 200, following selling 242,683 copies in its first week. The album also charted and peaked at number two on the  Australian Recording Industry Association, and Canadian sales charts. The album was certified Platinum in the United States on February 21, 2005. In 2006, the band won their first Grammy for Best Metal Performance with "Before I Forget". In 2009, Metal Hammer called it one of the "Albums of the Decade". It was also rated 31st in UK magazine Kerrang!s "The 50 Best Albums of the 21st Century" reader poll.
In 2005, the album was ranked number 396 in Rock Hard magazine's book The 500 Greatest Rock & Metal Albums of All Time.

Track listing
All tracks written by Corey Taylor, Mick Thomson, Shawn Crahan, Craig Jones, Jim Root, Chris Fehn, Paul Gray, Joey Jordison and Sid Wilson.

Personnel 
Aside from their real names, members of the band are referred to by numbers zero through eight.

Slipknot
 (#8) Corey Taylor – vocals
 (#7) Mick Thomson – guitars
 (#6) Shawn Crahan – percussion, backing vocals, art direction, photography
 (#5) Craig Jones – samplers, keyboards
 (#4) Jim Root – guitars
 (#3) Chris Fehn – percussion, backing vocals
 (#2) Paul Gray – bass, backing vocals
 (#1) Joey Jordison – drums, mixing
 (#0) Sid Wilson – turntables

Design
Michael Boland – design for The Boland Design CO.
Neil Zlozower – band photography

Production
Rick Rubin – producer
Greg Fidelman – mixing
Phillip Broussard – assistant engineer
Miles Wilson – assistant engineer
Dan Monti – assistant engineer
Lindsay Chase – album production coordination
Ted Jensen – mastering

Management
Monte Conner – A&R
Cory Brennan and Merck Mercuriadis – management for Sanctuary Artist Management Inc.
Michael Arfen – US booking agent for Writers and Artists Agency International
John Jackson – international booking agent for K2 Agency

Charts and certifications

Weekly charts

Year-end charts

Certifications

References

External links 
 

2004 albums
Albums produced by Rick Rubin
Roadrunner Records albums
Slipknot (band) albums
Albums recorded at The Mansion (recording studio)